Neram Nadi Kadu Akalidi is a 1976 Indian Telugu-language action drama film, produced by Y. V. Rao under the banner Ravi Chitra Films and directed by S. D. Lal. It stars N. T. Rama Rao and Manjula, with music composed by Satyam. It is a remake of the Hindi-language film Roti (1974), starring  Rajesh Khanna and Mumtaz.

Plot
The film begins with two linemen Sriramulu & Raghavaiah spotting notorious gangster Ranjit derailing who fires them in which Sriramulu dies and Raghavaiah loses his eyesight. Following, Sriramulu's wife also dies when out of hunger their son Vikram turns into a hoodlum and is raised by Ranjit unbeknownst. Years roll by, and henceforth Vikram wants to reform when Ranjit assigns him a terminal task to procure precious diamonds and charges his henchmen to eliminate him. Vikram trashes them and silently hands over the diamonds to the Police. Later, Vikram combats with a goon for a woman, in which he kills him and is sentenced. Anyhow, Ranjit is behind him when to protect an officer SP Rao Vikram surrenders, and their vehicle blasts, disclosing him as dead. 

Now he decides to kick off a new journey while traveling in a train, a passenger Sravan, recognizes him as a criminal by his handcuffs, and Sravan falls into a river in that clash. Next, Vikram lands at a village where a blind couple Raghavaiah & Seetamma, are waiting for their son's friend Vijay who assumes Vikram as him and gives him hospitality. Hereat, Vikram is acquainted with a girl Gowri and they crush. Once, Vikram learns Raghavaiah is his father's friend and also that he can detect the homicide. Besides, Punyakoti a cheapskate moneylender in the village pesters Raghavaiah for his debt and Vikram shields them. 

After a while, Vikram dies out of contrition being aware that Sravan is Raghavaiah's son when he divulges the actuality and asks for the penalty. However, they give pardon, embracing him as their son and they desire to move on a pilgrimage. So, Vikram tows them along with Gowri concealing himself from the hunt of Ranjit and the Police. In between, he is shocked to view Sravan alive amputating one limb and seeks vengeance but he backs observing his handful to his parents. Consequently, Ranjit and the police drop in. At that point, Ranjit kidnaps Gowri, when Raghiaviah discerns him. Thus far, Police surround, but Vikram's breakout ceases Ranjit. At last, Vikram surrenders and at the judiciary, he argues it is the crime of hunger when they understand his uprightness and acquit him. Finally, the movie ends on a happy note with the marriage of Vikram & Gowri.

Cast

N. T. Rama Rao as Vikram 
Manjula as Gowri 
Gummadi as Raghavaiah 
Murali Mohan as Sravan Kumar 
Prabhakar Reddy as S. P. Rao
Giri Babu as Kailash
Tyagaraju as Ranjith 
Padmanabham as Head Constable Meesala Venkata Swamy 
Allu Ramalingaiah as Punyakoti 
Raja Babu as Vijay 
Kanta Rao as Sriramulu
Rajanala
Mukkamala as Jailor 
Dr. Sivaramakrishnaiah
Balakrishna
Chitti Babu
K. K. Sarma
Pandari Bai as Seeta 
Jaya Malini as item number
Prabha as Lakshmi 
K. Vijaya

Soundtrack

Music composed by Satyam.

References

Indian action drama films
Telugu remakes of Hindi films
Films scored by Satyam (composer)
1970s action drama films
1970s Telugu-language films
Films directed by S. D. Lal